The 1976 Rhode Island gubernatorial election was held on November 2, 1976. Democratic nominee J. Joseph Garrahy defeated Republican nominee James L. Taft Jr. with 54.82% of the vote.

Primary elections
Primary elections were held on September 14, 1976.

Democratic primary

Candidates
J. Joseph Garrahy, incumbent Lieutenant Governor
Giovanni Folcarelli, former Lieutenant Governor

Results

General election

Candidates
Major party candidates
J. Joseph Garrahy, Democratic
James L. Taft Jr., Republican 

Other candidates
John C. Swift, Independent
Stewart L. Engel, Libertarian

Results

References

1976
Rhode Island
Gubernatorial